Julia Anne Blum (born 1967, Beverly Hills, California) is an American Orthodox Jewish singer, songwriter, actress, and speaker. A baalat teshuva, Blum studied music and theater at Harvard and Yale and worked with vocal coach Seth Riggs before becoming Orthodox in the late 1980s. She has released two albums, Stand Tall (1990) and Songs of the Heart (1998), and has toured throughout the United States, Canada and overseas.

Biography

Early life
Blum grew up in Beverly Hills, California. Her mother, Cynthia, is an elementary school teacher, while her father, Frederick, is an insurance executive. During Julia's childhood, the family attended a Conservative synagogue and celebrated the major Jewish holidays, and Julia received a bat mitzvah.

The young Blum took piano and ballet lessons from an early age and began acting and singing professionally at age 12, appearing in commercials and studying under noted voice coach Seth Riggs. She attended Beverly Hills High School, where she was a regular fixture in school productions.

She studied music and theater at Harvard and Yale University. At Yale, she was often cast in graduate school performances despite being an undergraduate student.

Turn to Orthodoxy and career in Jewish music
After graduating cum laude with distinction from Yale in 1988, Blum traveled abroad to Europe, Greece, and Israel. In the latter country, Blum, curious about her heritage, studied at an Orthodox women's yeshiva in Jerusalem, where she read biblical Hebrew texts, visited religious families, and kept Shabbat. The experience endeared her to Orthodoxy and inspired her to become a baalat teshuva.

Upon returning to the United States, Blum began writing and performing original music inspired by her newfound faith. She has released two albums, Stand Tall (1990) and Songs of the Heart (1998), the latter of which she co-produced with Ted Perlman and Dick Winograde. She currently tours several times a year, selling copies of her CDs at shows and talking about her spiritual journey in between songs.

Other activities
Blum was co-founder and academic director of the Beverly Hills Tutoring Center.

Artistry
Blum has been cited as a role model for artistic expression among Orthodox women and baalei teshuva, as she adheres to the rabbinic prohibition of kol isha by performing only for other women. Her music has been played by Michele Garner, the "Rockin' Rebbetzin" on her program The Kol Isha Show on WSIA.

Blum primarily sings in English with occasional Hebrew verses, including selections from Psalms. She also sings in French on the title song from Songs of the Heart. Her lyrical topics include family relationships ("Hey Little Sister"), her struggles with becoming religious ("Smelling Roses", "Longing for the Longing"), and the temporary nature of fame ("Greatness", "Price You Pay").

Discography

Albums
Stand Tall (1990, independent)
Songs of the Heart (1998, Firefly)

Other
Various, The Heart That Sings Soundtrack (2011) – composer (with Levi Yitzhak Garbose; "Kaddish Ballad" and "Kaddish Ballad Reprise")

Filmography
Camp Bnos Yisrael (2012; direct-to-video) – Counselor (3 episodes)

References

External links

Stand Tall and Songs of the Heart at the Harvard Library

1967 births
Actresses from Beverly Hills, California
Baalei teshuva
Jewish American actresses
Jewish American musicians
Jewish American songwriters
Jewish folk singers
American Orthodox Jews
Harvard University alumni
Yale University alumni
Living people
Singers from California
Orthodox Jewish women musicians
Songwriters from California
21st-century American Jews
21st-century American women